United Nations Security Council Resolution 1714, adopted unanimously on October 6, 2006, after recalling previous resolutions on the situation in Sudan, particularly resolutions 1590 (2005), 1627 (2005), 1653 (2006), 1653 (2006), 1663 (2006), 1679 (2006), 1706 (2006) and  1709 (2006), the Council extended the mandate of the United Nations Mission in Sudan (UNMIS) until April 30, 2007.

Resolution

Observations
The preamble of the resolution welcomed progress made in the implementation of the security arrangements contained in the Comprehensive Peace Agreement and the parties were also called to continue with the implementation of other aspects of that agreement. In this regard, there had been an improvement in the humanitarian situation in South Sudan.

There was concern at restrictions placed upon the UNMIS peacekeeping mission and the effect on its ability to perform its mandate effectively, and the use of child soldiers. Furthermore, it reiterated concern at the deteriorating humanitarian situation in Darfur and the need to end all violence and atrocities in that region.

The Council welcomed the African Union's decision to extend the mandate of the African Union Mission in Sudan until December 31, 2006.

Acts
Resolution 1714 decided to extend the mandate of UNMIS until the end of April 2007, with the intention of further renewals. The Secretary-General Kofi Annan was required to report every three months on the implementation of the mandate of UNMIS.

Finally, it called upon all parties to relevant peace and security agreements in Sudan to fully implement those agreements.

See also
 African Union Mission in Sudan
 African Union – United Nations Hybrid Operation in Darfur
 International response to the War in Darfur
 List of United Nations Security Council Resolutions 1701 to 1800 (2006–2008)
 South Sudan
 Timeline of the War in Darfur
 War in Darfur

References

External links
 
Text of the Resolution at undocs.org

 1714
2006 in Sudan
 1714
October 2006 events